Global Tiger Day, often called International Tiger Day, is an annual celebration to raise awareness for tiger conservation, held annually on 29 July. It was created in 2010 at the Saint Petersburg Tiger Summit in Russia.  The goal of the day is to promote a global system for protecting the natural habitats of tigers and to raise public awareness and support for tiger conservation issues. International Tiger Day has been shown to be effective in increasing online awareness on tigers through information search.

By year

2017 
The seventh annual Global Tiger Day was celebrated in various ways around the world. Local events have been organized in Bangladesh, Nepal, and India as well as non-tiger-range countries such as England and the United States. Some celebrities also participated by removing their social media profile photos. The World Wildlife Fund (WWF) continued its promotion of the "Double Tigers" campaign through investing in rangers. Several companies partnered with WWF to help raise awareness.

2018 
More awareness in the entire world of tiger populations and the challenges for their conservationists. India counts the number of wild tigers every four years and showed a promising rise from 1411 in 2006 to 2226 in 2014. The trend for rising population of tigers in India is as follows:

 In the year 2006 - 1411
 In the year 2010 - 1706
 In the year 2014 - 2226
 In the year 2019 - 2967..

India is a habitat of about 70% of total tigers on the earth.

2019 
On July 29, Indian Prime Minister Narendra Modi announced that the number of Indian tigers had grown to 3,000.

2022 
In occasion of the Global Tiger Day 2022, South Korean singers Hoshi and Tiger JK released on July 29th a single called "Tiger".

See also
 Tiger conservation
 
 Tiger hunting

References

External links
 The St. Petersburg Declaration on Tiger Conservation
 Tiger Recovery Program
 Official International Tiger Day Website, 2013
 International Tiger Day Website, WWF

Tiger
July observances
Tigers in popular culture